Guy Parselany (born August 1, 1978) is an Israeli professional basketball player with the San Diego Surf of the American Basketball Association (ABA). He is 7 ft 2 in (2.18 m) tall, and plays the Center position.
Guy Parselany is the tallest professional Israeli basketball player ever,after Gilad Levy (2.20m).

Early life
Guy Parselany is Jewish, was born in Haifa, Israel, and grew up in Qiryat Haim.He is the son of Arie and Roth, and has two younger brothers, Roy and Tal Parselany.
As a child Parselany played for Hapoel Haifa B.C. and Maccabi Haifa.
When he was 15 he moved to the Hapoel Holon youth team, winning the State Youth Championship. Simultaneously he played for his high school basketball team.

References

External links
 http://www.jpost.com/Sports/Article.aspx?id=137042
 http://www.maccabifans.co.il/News3.Asp?ID=6499&y=2009
 http://bsl.org.il/BoxScore.asp?GameID
 http://m.hupu.com/bbs/525881.html
 
 http://www.basket.co.il/TeamPage.asp?TeamId=79&cYear=2009&lang=en
 https://www.umobile.edu/Portals/0/ATHLETICS/2009-10mbballguide.pdf
 http://www.basket.co.il/PlayerPage.asp?PlayerNumber=16&TeamId=644&cYear=2000&lang=en
 http://kosarsport.hu/player/x0405/isrsv/A14114/parselani_g
 http://www.peachbeltconference.org/sports/mbkb/archive/0203mbbstats/ccsu08.htm
 http://www.eurobasket.com/teamRoster.asp?Cntry=ISR&Team=2896&option=Ironi%20Kiryat%20Ata&Cntr=ISR&bkgColor=FFFFFF&rowColor=FFCCFF&fontColor=000000&showStaff=On&showAveg=On&showCmOrInch=both&curRoster=Y&rosterType=display&logo=eqiryat.gif&showLogo=On&showFrTo=On&showTeamName=On

1978 births
Living people
Israeli men's basketball players
Ironi Kiryat Ata players
Centers (basketball)